"American Idiot" is a protest song by the American rock band Green Day. The first single released from the album  American Idiot, the song received positive reviews by critics and was nominated for four 2005 Grammy Awards: Record of the Year, Best Rock Performance by a Duo or Group with Vocal, Best Rock Song, and Best Music Video. It is considered one of the band's signature songs.

Background
One of the two explicitly political songs on the album (the other being fellow single "Holiday"), "American Idiot" says that mass media has orchestrated paranoia and idiocy among the public. Citing cable news coverage of the Iraq War, Billie Joe Armstrong recalled, "They had all these Geraldo-like journalists in the tanks with the soldiers, getting the play-by-play." He felt with that, American news crossed the line from journalism to reality television, showcasing violent footage intercut with advertisements. Armstrong went on to write the song after hearing the Lynyrd Skynyrd song "That's How I Like It" on his car radio. "It was like, 'I'm proud to be a redneck' and I was like, 'oh my God, why would you be proud of something like that?' This is exactly what I'm against." Songwriter Mike Dirnt felt many people would be insulted by the track until they realized that, rather than it being a finger-pointing song of anger, it could be viewed as a "call for individuality". The song emphasizes strong language, juxtaposing the words "faggot" and "America", to create what he imagined would be a voice for the disenfranchised.

In a 2004 interview with Q Magazine, the three members of Green Day discussed the idea of flag desecration in relation to their song, with Armstrong and Dirnt being the most supportive: "It means nothing to me. Let's burn the fucking thing."

Composition

"American Idiot" was written in the key of A major. The song is composed of four chords, the I-IV-VII-IV-I-VII progression, while the chorus and solo share the IV-I-V-I progression. The song is classified as a punk rock and pop-punk song. The musical style of the song has been cited as a mix of the melodic punk of Social Distortion and the hard rock of Joan Jett. Armstrong plays a 1956 Les Paul Junior on the song, switching to a reissued 1959 flame-top Les Paul for the double-tracked guitar solo. Armstrong was initially reluctant to pursue recording a solo, fearing it to be corny. He eventually decided against this, as he hoped for the album to be "about being 15 and rocking out in front of a mirror." The song's format and cadence was influenced by the Midnight Oil song "US Forces", which Armstrong was introduced to through his wife.

Release
Released in 2004, the single peaked at number 61 on the Billboard Hot 100, becoming Green Day's first Billboard Hot 100 chart entry. All of Green Day's other hits had only managed to chart on the Hot 100 Airplay chart or the Bubbling Under Hot 100 chart. However, the appearance of "American Idiot" on the US singles charts occurred just prior to Billboard's inclusion of Internet download purchases into their Billboard Hot 100 chart data, which would have made a significant difference in the song's peak had it benefited from the new chart tabulation system. "American Idiot" became Green Day's first top-five single in the United Kingdom, peaking at number 3, and it debuted at number 1 in Canada. In Australia, the song reached number 7 was ranked number 22 on Triple J's Hottest 100 of 2004. Green Day performed the song at the 2005 Grammy Awards. "American Idiot" has sold 1,371,000 copies as of July 2010.

Ian Winwood of Kerrang! said that "Green Day did for their generation, and their country, what the Sex Pistols did for the United Kingdom in 1977, for a nation sick with love for a parasitical royal family."

Music video
The music video for "American Idiot" shows the band playing in a warehouse against a green American flag (a reference to the name of the band), which only has 48 stars. In the middle of the video, the band is seen playing at different speeds (fast, slow-motion, and normal speed).  During the bridge, the stripes of the flag melt onto the floor. The band is then sprayed by a green liquid from amplifiers next to the flag. At the end, the band drop their instruments and leave. The song's video was directed by Samuel Bayer. The video won the Viewer's Choice Award and also nominated as Best Art Direction.

Live version
Green Day's 2011 live album Awesome as Fuck contained a live rendition of the song, featuring an extended guitar solo, recorded in Montreal, Quebec, Canada on the 21st Century Breakdown World Tour. It was also featured in their 2005 live album Bullet in a Bible, set at Milton Keynes Bowl.

Accolades
"American Idiot" was ranked the number 13 Single of the Decade by Rolling Stone magazine in 2009. VH1 also placed the song at number 13 on its Top 100 Songs of the 2000s in 2011. Rolling Stone ranked it number 432 of The 500 Greatest Songs of All Time in 2010, the only Green Day song on the list.  The song is certified Gold in the United Kingdom for sales of 400,000.

Use as a protest song
In advance of Donald Trump's visit to the UK in July 2018, a campaign to get "American Idiot" to the top of the UK song charts was launched. On the Official UK Charts dated 13 July 2018, the song re-entered the UK Singles Chart at 25 and the UK Singles Downloads Chart at number 2.

Track listing

7-inch picture disc

Personnel
 Billie Joe Armstrong – lead vocals, guitar
 Mike Dirnt – bass, backing vocals, lead vocals on "Governator"
 Tré Cool – drums, backing vocals

Production
 Rob Cavallo; Green Day – producers
 Chris Dugan; Doug McKean – engineer
 Brian "Dr. Vibb" Vibberts; Greg "Stimie" Burns; Jimmy Hoyson; Joe Brown; Dmitar "Dim-e" Krnjaic; Reto Peter – assistant engineers
 Chris Lord-Alge – mixing
 Ted Jensen – mastering
 Chris Bilheimer – cover art

Charts and certifications

Weekly charts

Year-end charts

Certifications

Release history

See also
 List of anti-war songs

References

 
 
 

2004 songs
2004 singles
American Idiot
Anti-war songs
Cultural depictions of American people
Cultural depictions of George W. Bush
Green Day songs
Music videos directed by Samuel Bayer
Protest songs
Reprise Records singles
Song recordings produced by Rob Cavallo
Songs about the media
Songs about the United States
Songs of the Iraq War
Songs written by Billie Joe Armstrong
Spike Video Game Award winners